Dirtgirlworld, stylized as dirtgirlworld, is a children's television series, created by Cate McQuillen and Hewey Eustace of Mememe Productions. Visually designed by Jean Camden, James Hackett and Cate McQuillen, it was animated by Hackett Films in Australia and Spin Productions in Canada. The show was co-produced by Mememe Productions (Australia) and Decode Entertainment (Canada). The show has 52 eleven-minute episodes commissioned by CBeebies, the Canadian Broadcasting Corporation (CBC) and the Australian Broadcasting Corporation (ABC).

The show first aired on CBC on 5 October 2009, on CBeebies on 2 November 2009, and on ABC on 4 December 2009. It aired in the United States on Sprout, on 22 April 2010.

The series used 3D CGI animation combined with photomontage and live action.

Main characters
The main characters are dirtgirl (the titular protagonist, voiced by Maree Lowes) and scrapboy (her best friend, voiced by Michael Balk), as well as their friends ken (voiced by Gibson Nolte), grubby (voiced by Krew Boylan) and hayman (voiced by Jason Davis).

Awards
 2013 Emmy Awards – Digital content for Children and Young People
 2010 Australian Film Institute Awards – Best Children's Animated Series
 2010 Australian Directors' Guild – GRASS award (Green awareness encouragement award)
 2010 Australian Directors Guild – Best Direction in an Animation Program
 2011 Byron Bay Film Festival – Best Animation
 2010 British Academy Children's Awards – Nominated for International
 2010 Prix Jeunesse – 0-5 years Finalist
 2010 Logie Awards – Nominated for Outstanding Children's Production
 2011 Seoul INPUT Festival – Participant
 2012 Japan Prize – Finalist
 2011 ARIA Music Awards – Nominated for Best Children's Album
 2012 ARIA Music Awards – Nominated for Best Children's Album
 2011 International Songwriting Competition – Best Kid's Song
 2013 Screen Producers Australia – Interactive Production of the Year

ARIA Music Awards

References

External links
 Official website
 
 
 
 

Australian children's animated adventure television series
Canadian children's animated adventure television series
2000s Australian animated television series
2010s Australian animated television series
2009 Australian television series debuts
2011 Australian television series endings
2000s Canadian animated television series
2010s Canadian animated television series
2009 Canadian television series debuts
2011 Canadian television series endings
Australian computer-animated television series
Canadian computer-animated television series
Television series by DHX Media
Australian preschool education television series
Canadian preschool education television series
Animated preschool education television series
2000s preschool education television series
2010s preschool education television series
CBeebies
Animated television series about children
English-language television shows